Heider Dias Sotero or simply Heider (born February 17, 1987 in Paulista), is a Brazilian attacking midfielder. He plays for Central.

External links
CBF
sportnet

1987 births
Living people
Brazilian footballers
Sport Club do Recife players
Sportspeople from Pernambuco
Association football midfielders